The Evangelical Lutheran Church of Hong Kong (Abbreviated as ELCHK) is a Lutheran denomination in Hong Kong.

History 
On 27 February 1954, its establishing ceremony was held at Tao Fong Shan, Sha Tin with representatives from all Lutheran congregations in Hong Kong joined in. Originally established with the Chinese Lutheran Church in the 1920s, the Lutheran Theological Seminary and the Lutheran Publishing House became part of the ELCHK.

It is a member of the Lutheran World Federation, which it joined in 1957. It is also a member of the Hong Kong Christian Council.

See also
 ELCHK Lutheran Secondary School

References

External links 

Official website
Lutheran World Federation listing 

Lutheran denominations
Lutheran World Federation members
Evangelical denominations in Asia
Protestant churches in Hong Kong